Tallwood High School  is a secondary school in southwest Virginia Beach, Virginia. It was built on the site of an old colonial plantation whose manor house was Tallwood, hence the name of the school. Tallwood was remodeled during 2004–2005.

One of the school's most remarkable features is the Global Studies and World Languages Academy. It's one of several magnet programs in Virginia Beach. Students throughout the city interested in a studying global issues and foreign languages can apply.

Debate
Members of Tallwood's Debate team won the VHSL State Championships in AAA in 2000, 2001, 2003, and 2004. Deborah Plummer served as head coach of Tallwood's Debate team until 2007.

In the 1999-2000 VHSL State Debate Tournament, Tallwood's Four Person Policy Debate squad clinched the AAA championship. This win represented the first VHSL State Championship in the history of Tallwood High School's academic and athletic competitions. In the 2000-2001 VHSL State Debate Tournament, Tallwood's Four Person Policy Debate squad achieved a repeat AAA championship.

In the 2001-2002 VHSL State Debate Tournament, Tallwood's Affirmative Policy Debate team competed in the AAA group and was awarded the first place speaker award after receiving first-place team awards at District and Regional tournaments.

In the 2002-2003 VHSL State Debate Tournament, Tallwood achieved its third State Championship. In the 2003-2004 VHSL State Debate Tournament, Tallwood achieved its fourth State Championship.

In the 2004-2005 VHSL State Debate Tournament, Tallwood debaters were awarded second-place in the AAA group. In the 2006-2007 VHSL State Debate tournament, this squad returned for another second-place team award.

Sports
In 2005, Tallwood's Boys Volleyball Team was named Beach District Champion 7 out of the past 8 years with a state championship in 2004. They were regional champions 1998, 2000, 2002, 2004, 2005.

In 2006, Tallwood's Boys Basketball team became the Beach Regular Season Champion, Eastern Region Champions, as well as becoming State Semifinalist. In 2007 the team repeated as the Regular Season Beach District champs.

In 1998 the Tallwood Football team went 12-1 and won the District and Regional Championship. They ended up losing to Varina High School in the State semi-finals.

Johnathan Dunn joined the NFL in 2005. In the summer of 2010, Dunn came back to coach Tallwood.

Notable alumni
Johnathan Dunn, Former Football Offensive Tackler
Chad Hartigan, Film Director

See also
AAA Eastern Region
AAA Beach District

References

 School Report Card
 Tallwood HS official site
 Tallwood HS official Drama Club site

External links
 Virginia Beach City Public Schools
 Virginia Beach school mascots and colors
 Tallwood High School band

Educational institutions established in 1992
Magnet schools in Virginia
High schools in Virginia Beach, Virginia
Public high schools in Virginia
1992 establishments in Virginia